Joni Silva Brandão (born 20 November 1989) is a Portuguese cyclist, who most recently rode for UCI Continental team .

Major results
Source: 

2008
 1st Stage 5 Tour of Galicia
2010
 3rd Road race, National Under-23 Road Championships
2011
 1st  Overall Volta a Portugal do Futuro
1st Stage 1
2013
 1st  Road race, National Road Championships
 6th Overall Tour d'Azerbaïdjan
2014
 4th Overall Volta a Portugal
 National Road Championships
5th Road race
5th Time trial
 8th Klasika Primavera
2015
 2nd Road race, National Road Championships
 2nd Overall Volta a Portugal
 8th Overall Vuelta a la Comunidad de Madrid
2016
 1st  Overall Volta Internacional Cova da Beira
1st Stage 3
 3rd Overall Vuelta a Castilla y León
 5th Overall Volta a Portugal
1st  Mountains classification
 6th Road race, National Road Championships
2017
 6th Clássica Aldeias do Xisto
 7th Clássica da Arrábida
2018
 2nd Road race, National Road Championships
 2nd Overall Volta a Portugal
 2nd Clássica Aldeias do Xisto
 3rd Overall GP Beiras e Serra da Estrela
 3rd Overall Troféu Joaquim Agostinho
 6th Road race, Mediterranean Games
2019
 2nd Overall Volta a Portugal
 3rd Overall GP Beiras e Serra da Estrela
1st Stage 3
 5th Road race, National Road Championships
2020
 4th Overall Volta a Portugal
1st Stage 4
2021
 4th Overall Volta a Portugal
 9th Overall Volta ao Algarve

References

External links

1989 births
Living people
Portuguese male cyclists
Competitors at the 2018 Mediterranean Games
Mediterranean Games competitors for Portugal
Sportspeople from Santa Maria da Feira